Sam Chifney might refer to:

Samuel Chifney Sr. (c. 1753–1807), also known as Sam Chifney the elder, an English jockey; or his son,
Samuel Chifney Jr., also an English jockey